Sevasadanam is a 1938 Indian Tamil-language drama film directed by K. Subrahmanyam. It is one of the early Tamil films to be set in a contemporary social setting and to advocate reformist social policies. This was the first film for M. S. Subbulakshmi and the Tamil debut of Telugu actress S. Varalakshmi.

Plot 
An abused wife Sumathi (M. S. Subbulakshmi)  is driven out of her house by husband and later forced into prostitution. Later she reforms her ways and devotes her life to running an institution for the children of prostitutes.

Production 
After the success of Balayogini (1937), director Subramanyam was encouraged to make more socially oriented films. In 1938 he decided to make a film version of Premchand's novel Bazaar-e-Husn and bought the rights for 4,000 (worth 72 lakh in 2021 prices). While Balayogini was about the travails of widows, Sevasadanam dealt with domestic abuse, prostitution and women's liberation. Subramanyam wrote the screenplay himself and made the film under his Madras United Artists Corporation Banner. The completed film was 18,900 feet in length with a run time of 210 minutes.

Cast 
M. S. Subbulakshmi - Sumathi
F. G. Natesa Iyer - Eashwara Iyer
S. Varalakshmi
S. G. Pattu Iyer
Kumari Kamala
"Jolly" Kittu Iyer
Jayalakshmi
Ram Pyari

Reception 
Sevasadanam was released on 2 May 1938. It was a critical and commercial success. Ananda Vikatan favourably reviewed the film on 8 May 1938:

As was the case with Balayogini, conservative Hindus were upset with Sevasadanam.

The veteran Marxist leader N. Sankaraiah, has described Seva Sadhanam as an "unusual film" for choosing the subject of marriages between young girls and old men (which had social sanction). According to him, the film successfully broughout the "sufferings of the girl" and the "mental agony of the aged husband". Sankariah particularly appreciated Natesa Iyer's performance in the role of the old man, which he said " was impressive". Tamil film critic and historian Aranthai Narayanan observes in his book Thamizh Cinemavin Kathai (The Story of Tamil Cinema) that "Seva Sadhanam proved a turning point in the history of Tamil cinema. In the climax, the aged husband, now a totally changed man, was shown as casting aside with utter contempt his `sacred thread', which symbolises his Brahmin superiority. It came as a  stunning blow to the then Brahmin orthodoxy."

Availability 
No print of Sevasadanam is known to survive, making it a lost film. While K. Subrahmanyam's family only have a few surviving photographs related to the film in their possession, the complete set of 78 rpm gramophone records in their original envelopes has survived in the collection of musicologist V. A. K. Ranga Rao in Chennai.

See also 
 Tamil films of the 1930s

References

External links 
 
 http://www.dhingana.com/maa-ramanan-song-sevasadanam-tamil-oldies-399aa31
Film India Magazine 1938 at Archive.org

1938 films
Adaptations of works by Premchand
1930s Tamil-language films
Films scored by Papanasam Sivan
Lost Indian films
Indian drama films
1938 drama films
Indian black-and-white films
1938 lost films
Lost drama films
Films directed by K. Subramanyam
Films based on works by Premchand